The Colorado City Formation is a geologic formation in Texas, United States. It preserves fossils dating back to the Triassic period.

Biochronological significance
The Otis Chalk localities that are situated in the Colorado City Formation form the basis of the Otischalkian Land Vertebrate Faunachron (LVF), which is defined by the first appearance of Parasuchus.

Vertebrate fauna

See also

 List of fossiliferous stratigraphic units in Texas
 Paleontology in Texas

References

 

Triassic geology of Texas